Sandra Itzel (born 31 December 1993) is a Mexican actress and singer, best known for her role of Mayrita in the Univision telenovela Gata salvaje (2002–2003). She is currently part of the Colombian band La Sonora Dinamita as a vocalist.

Career 
Itzel began her acting career at age 5 on the 1997 Mexican telenovela El privilegio de amar, where she played Dulce. Two years later she entered at the Centro de Educación Artística of Televisa, two months after joining the Televisa academy, Nicandro Díaz chose her to be part of the telenovela Carita de ángel, where she played Chabelita Pérez. Subsequently, Silvia Pinal chose her to appear in an episode of her series Mujer, casos de la vida real, where she played the role of a girl with cerebral palsy. Then made the theater version of Carita de ángel entitled Carita de ángel, las nuevas aventuras en vivo, where she played the villain of the story.

Her rise to fame was in the telenovela filming in Miami, titled Gata salvaje, where she acted alongside Marlene Favela. In this telenovela she played Mayrita, a sweet girl whom her mother does not love. After Gata salvaje, she had a participation in the 2004 telenovela Ángel rebelde. Since then it lasted several years away from the telenovelas. Subsequently, before she turned 18 years old, she joined the cast of the telenovela El Talismán in 2011, and subsequently she appears in the 2013 Univision telenovela entitled Rosario. Her last appearance in a series or long-running telenovela was in the third season of the series El Señor de los Cielos, where she played Luciana Morejón, the president's daughter during that season.

Personal life 
She maintains a relationship with Cuban actor Adrián Di Monte since 2013.

Filmography

References

External links 
 

1993 births
Living people
20th-century Mexican actresses
21st-century Mexican actresses
Mexican women singers
People from Mexico City
People educated at Centro de Estudios y Formación Actoral